Oboe Sonata in general is a sonata composed for oboe, 
Oboe Sonata may also refer to:
 Oboe Sonata (Howells)
 Oboe Sonata (Poulenc)
 Oboe Sonata (Saint-Saëns)